Perfect Ten is the third studio album by American record producer Mustard, released on June 28, 2019, by 10 Summers Records and Interscope Records. It includes the singles "Pure Water", "100 Bands", and "Ballin'", which were Mustard's only hit songs as solo act. In December 2019, the album was certified gold by the RIAA for over 500,000 album-equivalent units.

It features collaborations from 1TakeJay, Migos & Quavo as a solo artist, YG, Tyga, ASAP Ferg, ASAP Rocky, Nav, Playboi Carti, A Boogie wit da Hoodie, Future, Young Thug, Gunna, Ty Dolla Sign, Ella Mai, Roddy Ricch, and the late Nipsey Hussle.

Background
Mustard said that the album features "a lot of anthems" and that "all of [his] friends are on it". The cover is an image of Mustard as a child.

Promotion
Mustard announced the album at the Power 106 Liftoff Edition concert festival on May 18, then on social media on May 21, 2019.

Critical reception

Fred Thomas of AllMusic gave the album 3.5 stars out of 5, calling the album "another vibrant exhibit of Mustard's gifts at arranging sounds that can start the party or spark deep feelings."

Track listing
Adapted from Apple Music, credits adapted from Tidal.

Notes
  signifies a co-producer
  signifies an additional producer
  signifies an uncredited co-producer

Samples
 "Intro" samples "If I Ever Fall in Love" by Shai.
 "Ballin'" samples "Get It Together" by 702.

Personnel
Credits adapted from Tidal.

 David Pizzimenti – recording , mixing 
Christian "CQ" Quinonez – recording 
 Pro Logic – recording 
 Roark Bailey – recording 
 Bryan Anzel – recording 
 Alex Tumay – recording 
 Chris Ascher – recording 
 James Royo – recording 
 Mustard – mixing 
 Dave Kutch – mastering

Charts

Weekly charts

Year-end charts

Certifications

References

2019 albums
Albums produced by DJ Mustard
Mustard (record producer) albums